Maoilin Mac Bruideadha, Irish poet, died 1582.

Maoilin succeeded his brother, Diarmuid Mac Bruideadha, as head of the family and ollamh to O Brian. He was succeeded by his son, Maoilin Óg.

The name is now anglicized as Mac Brody or Brody.

See also

 Seán Buí Mac Bruideadha, fl. 14th century.
 Diarmuid Mac Bruideadha, died 1563.
 Maoilin Óg Mac Bruideadha, nephew of the above, died 1602.
 Concubhair Mac Bruideadha, son of the above, alive 1636.
 Tadhg mac Dáire Mac Bruaideadha, c.1570-1652.

External links
 http://www.clarelibrary.ie/eolas/coclare/literature/bardic/clares_bardic_tradition.htm

MacBrody family
Irish-language poets
People from County Clare
16th-century Irish historians
16th-century Irish writers
People of Elizabethan Ireland
1582 deaths